The 1st State Council of Ceylon was a meeting of the State Council of Ceylon, with the membership determined by the results of the 1931 state council election held between 13 and 20 June 1931. The parliament met for the first time on 7 July 1931 and was dissolved on 7 December 1935.

Election
The 1st state council election was held between 13 and 20 June 1931 in 37 of the 50 constituencies. No nominations were received in four constituencies in the north of the country due to a boycott organised by the Jaffna Youth Congress. The remaining nine constituencies only had a single nomination each and consequently the candidates were elected without a vote. The remaining nine constituencies only had a single nomination each and consequently the candidates were elected without a vote. In addition the Governor nominated eight additional members, John William Oldfield, Maurice John Cary, I. X. Pereira, M. K. Saldin, V. R. S. Schokman, Evelyn Charles Villiers, Thomas Lister Villiers and Stewart Schneider.

The new state council met for the first time on 7 July 1931 and elected A. F. Molamure, F. A. Obeysekera and M. M. Subramaniam as Speaker, Deputy Speaker and Chairman of Committees and Deputy Chairman of Committees respectively. The seven chairman of the State Council's executive committees, who were members of the Board of Ministers, were also appointed. The State Council was ceremonially opened on 10 July 1931.

Following the end of the boycott in the north of the country by-elections were held in the four constituencies in early July 1934. The newly elected members entered the state council on 17 July 1934.

Members

Deaths, resignations and removals
The 1st state council saw the following deaths, resignations and removals from office:
1931: Ratnasothy Saravanamuttu (Colombo North) unseated after being found guilty of corrupt practices by an election Judge. His wife Naysum was elected in the ensuing by-election.
 September 1931: Godfrey Edward Madawala (Naramala) died. W. H. de S. Jayasundara elected at subsequent by-election.
 August 1933: Cudah Ratwatte (Balangoda) resigned due to ill-health. T. G. Jayewardene elected at subsequent by-election.

List

References

1931 establishments in Ceylon
1935 disestablishments in Ceylon